= Bhairopur =

- village
- Location within Madhya Pradesh Location within India
- Coordinates: 23.152918°N 77.479400°E
- Country: India
- State: Madhya Pradesh
- District: Bhopal
- Tehsil: Huzur

Population (2011)
  - Total: 2,480
- Time zone: UTC+5:30 (IST)
- ISO 3166 code: MP-IN
- Census code: 482546

Bhairopur is a village in the Bhopal district of Madhya Pradesh, India. It is located in the Huzur tehsil and the Phanda block. A campus of the SCOPE Engineering College is located nearby.

== Demographics ==
According to the 2011 census of India, Bhairopur has 564 households. The effective literacy rate (i.e. the literacy rate of population excluding children aged 6 and below) is 85.61%.

Demographics (2011 Census)
	Total	Male	Female
Population	2480	1325	1155
Children aged below 6 years	312	170	142
Scheduled caste	375	191	184
Scheduled tribe	158	78	80
Literates	1856	1040	816
Workers (all)	881	662	219
Main workers (total)	725	566	159
Main workers: Cultivators	89	75	14
Main workers: Agricultural labourers	65	47	18
Main workers: Household industry workers	31	17	14
Main workers: Other	540	427	113
Marginal workers (total)	156	96	60
Marginal workers: Cultivators	8	2	6
Marginal workers: Agricultural labourers	5	2	3
Marginal workers: Household industry workers	5	2	3
Marginal workers: Others	138	90	48
Non-workers	1599	663	936
